Manicouagan is a federal electoral district in Quebec, Canada, that has been represented in the House of Commons of Canada since 1968.

The riding was created in 1966 from parts of Charlevoix and Saguenay ridings.

The neighbouring ridings are Abitibi—Baie-James—Nunavik—Eeyou, Chicoutimi—Le Fjord, Montmorency—Charlevoix—Haute-Côte-Nord, Haute-Gaspésie—La Mitis—Matane—Matapédia, Gaspésie—Îles-de-la-Madeleine and Labrador.

This riding gained territory from Montmorency—Charlevoix—Haute-Côte-Nord during the 2012 electoral redistribution.

Demographics
According to the Canada 2016 Census

 Languages: (2016) 85.5% French, 8.7% Innu, 4.5% English, 0.6% Naskapi, 0.1% Spanish, 0.1% Arabic, 0.1% Italian, 0.1% Portuguese

Members of Parliament

This riding has elected the following Members of Parliament:

Election results

See also
 List of Canadian federal electoral districts
 Past Canadian electoral districts

Notes

References

Campaign expense data from Elections Canada
Riding history from the Library of Parliament

Notes

Quebec federal electoral districts
Baie-Comeau
Sept-Îles, Quebec